The Caproni Ca.79 was an Italian light bomber produced in the mid-1920s.

Design

Wing
The wing structure consisted of two side members connected by joists and stiffened by cruises. The ribs were then inserted onto the side members. The ribs were very light and made of trellis, with duralumin insoles, steel tube uprights and adjustable steel wire crossbars.

Fuselage and armaments
At the center of the lower wing is the fuselage, made of steel tube. The lower side member is a lattice beam to which the carriages are anchored, the tie rods for stiffening the lower wing and the bombs. On the left side, two doors allowed access inside the fuselage: in the piloting position and at another place behind the wing. The two pilot seats were wide, at the top and in front of the front side member of the wing, separated by a short ladder. The controls are placed between the two pilots and on the ceiling of the fuselage. In the bow of the fuselage was located the turret for the machine gun and the place for the observer and its commands for the release of the bombs. Under the fuselage there was a second turret for the shot, which lowered with the weight of the machine gun (disappearing instead when it was not used). Aeroplani Caproni dal 1908 al 1935

Engine 
Of the four engines, two were positioned in tandem, centrally to the cell above the fuselage, while each of the other two were positioned anteriorly, on the wings. The engines were started by compressed air, produced by a compressor unit located under the seat of the right hand rider.

Operators

 Regia Aeronautica

Specifications

See also

References

Ca.079
1920s Italian bomber aircraft
Biplanes with negative stagger
Aircraft first flown in 1925
Four-engined push-pull aircraft